Barry Lines (16 May 1942 – 8 January 2023) was an English professional footballer who played 266 league matches for Northampton Town. He played either at outside left or inside left.

Lines died on 8 January 2023, at the age of 80.

References

External links
Barry Lines - 11v11

1942 births
2023 deaths
English footballers
Northampton Town F.C. players
English Football League players
Association football outside forwards
People from Bletchley